New Buildings railway station served Newbuildings, County Londonderry in Northern Ireland. New Buildings railway was very popular with local people, especially for excursions such as Sunday school outings, and trips to the seaside. Rabbits were also caught and sent to London by train and boat. Salmon was caught in the Foyle and sent to Billingsgate Market the next day.
It was opened by the Donegal Railway Company on 6 August 1900. 
It closed on 1 January 1955.

Routes

References

Disused railway stations in County Londonderry
Railway stations opened in 1900
Railway stations closed in 1955
Railway stations in Northern Ireland opened in the 20th century